Stapleton is an independent rock band who come from Glasgow.  They formed in April 1997 and have released four albums and two EPs.  They have to date played over 300 shows.  They have released records on a number of independent record labels and are presently signed to Xtra Mile Recordings in the UK and This Time Records in Japan.  The band consist of Andrew Cook (Guitar & Vocals), Gordon Farquhar (Drums & Percussion), Alistair Paxton (Vocals & Guitar) and Nico Weststeijn (Bass).

History

Stapleton first came to prominence in the Glasgow DIY music scene of the late nineties, playing early shows alongside bands such as Karate, Bluetip, Dismemberment Plan and Les Savy Fav. They were an integral and ubiquitous part of a supportive and diverse independent Scottish music scene that also included bands such as Laeto, Sawyer, Idlewild, Aereogramme and Biffy Clyro.

The turn of the millennium brought an increase in touring for Stapleton, as well as a first full release; 'Rebuild The Pier' on the English label Year 3 Thousand Records. Recorded at the Brill Building, Glasgow over two days by Richie Dempsey, Rebuild The Pier was critically acclaimed by national press and has retrospectively been regarded as a pioneering, landmark record by many bands and individuals. The 2001 follow up, 'On The Enjoyment of Unpleasant Places', achieved a similar status on its release through the legendary English label Subjugation Records. Initial pressings of the record sold very quickly and, indeed, it remained out of print until a repackaged version (including the Icy You EP) was released in 2004. 2002 saw the release of two EPs by Stapleton; firstly, the 'Icy You' EP, made up of songs from the 'On The Enjoyment' sessions, and secondly, the 'Chez Chef' EP, recorded in London by Pat Collier and Larry Hibbitt. Stapleton toured prolifically around this time, supporting high-profile peers such as Idlewild, Snow Patrol and Hundred Reasons, as well as highly regarded independent touring bands like Lungfish, Weakerthans, Q and not U, Pedro The Lion, Tristeza and Burning Airlines. It was through a Glasgow show with Burning Airlines that Stapleton became involved with the esteemed musician and engineer J. Robbins.

May 2005 saw Stapleton record their third album, 'Hug The Coast', in Robbins' Baltimore studio, The Magpie Cage. Hug The Coast was released in late 2005 on Gravity Records and contained artwork by Grammy nominated artist Jesse LeDoux. Following considerable touring, Stapleton chose to go on hiatus in Summer of 2006, though only after recording a fourth album 'Rest and be Thankful' with their friend and live engineer Robin Sutherland. Rest and be Thankful was released in May 2008 on Xtra Mile Recordings, and was supported by a short UK tour.

Though they are presently on hiatus, members of Stapleton are active with other bands.  These include Metronomes, Happy Particles, Avast! and Elements of the Seventies.

Discography

Studio albums
Rebuild the Pier (2000) Year 3 Thousand
On The Enjoyment of Unpleasant Places (2001) Subjugation Records
On The Enjoyment of Unpleasant Places + Icy You (2004) Gravity DIP Records
Hug The Coast (2005) Gravity DIP Records
Rest and be Thankful (2008) Xtra Mile Recordings

EPs and split singles
Acres & Yards  ('Mosh & Go' 7") released in October 2001 on Fierce Panda Records.
The Boredom of Bread, The Fun of Cake (split CD with Beezewax) released in October 2001 on Biscay Records
Icy You (EP) released in April 2002 on Gravity DIP Records
Chez Chef (EP) released in December 2002 on Gravity DIP Records
Happy Homes and the Hearts That Make Them / Northwest Corners (split 10" with Dartz!) released in April 2006 on Gravity DIP Records
Sports Cars And Devil Worship on 'Souvenir', Cable tribute album released October 2006 on Signature Tune Records.

References

External links 
Stapleton on Myspace
Banquet Records
Stapleton Interview on Rockmidgets.com
Stapleton article archive at Drowned In Sound
Happy Particles
Metronomes
Avast!

Scottish rock music groups
Musical groups established in 1997